The Tonga language of Mozambique, or Gitonga (spelled Guitonga in Portuguese) is a Bantu language spoken along the southern coast of the country. Often thought to be closest to Chopi to its south, the two languages have only a 44% lexical similarity.

References

External links
Christian hymns, together with some of the Psalms of David in the language of the Ba Tonga, as spoken in the district of Inhambane, east Africa (1901)
Ruthe. Samuele: Ruth, and I. Samuel, chapters I to IV, in the Gitonga language (1902)
Itestamente lipya nya pfumu yatu Jesu Kristu: kanga ku lobidwego ki gitonga (1905)

Southern Bantu languages
Languages of Mozambique